Sunday ("Sunny") Oyarekhua  was a Nigerian international football forward.

Football career
A career policeman, Oyarekhua was discovered by the national team's coaches while playing for the Police F.C. of Lagos.

Oyarekhua scored 17 times in 28 appearances for Nigeria between 1971 and 1976. He scored on his debut, a friendly match against the Upper Volta in 1971. He was the leading scorer on Nigeria's 1973 All-Africa Games winning squad. Oyarekhua also played for Nigeria at the 1976 African Cup of Nations finals in Ethiopia.

He recently retired as the Assistant Commissioner of the Osun State Police.

References

External links
Nigeriasports.com
Guardian, "Adieu Haruna Ilerika"
Goalscoring for Nigeria National Team (rsssf)

Living people
Nigerian footballers
Nigeria international footballers
1976 African Cup of Nations players
African Games gold medalists for Nigeria
African Games medalists in football
Association football forwards
Year of birth missing (living people)
Footballers at the 1973 All-Africa Games